The following is a list of U.S. states, territories and the District of Columbia ranked by the proportion of African Americans of full or partial descent including those of Hispanic origin, in the population. Considering only those who marked "black" and no other race in combination as in the first table, the percentage was 12.4% in 2020, down from 12.6% in 2010. Considering those who marked "black" and any other race in combination as in the second table the percentage increased from 13.6% to 14.2%.

2020 census (single race)

African-American proportion of state and territory populations (1790–2020)
From 1787 to 1868, enslaved African-Americans were counted in the U.S. census under the Three-fifths Compromise. The compromise was an agreement reached during the 1787 United States Constitutional Convention over the counting of slaves in determining a state's total population. This count would determine the number of seats in the House of Representatives and how much each state would pay in taxes. The compromise counted three-fifths of each state's slave population toward that state's total population for the purpose of apportioning the House of Representatives. Even though slaves were denied voting rights, this gave Southern states more Representatives and more presidential electoral votes than if slaves had not been counted. Free blacks and indentured servants were not subject to the compromise, and each was counted as one full person for representation. 

In the United States Constitution, the Three-fifths Compromise is part of Article 1, Section 2, Clause 3. Section 2 of the Fourteenth Amendment (1868) later superseded this clause and explicitly repealed the compromise.

Free blacks as a percentage out of the total black population by U.S. region and U.S. state between 1790 and 1860
In 1865, all enslaved blacks (African Americans) in the United States were emancipated as a result of the Thirteenth Amendment. However, some U.S. states had previously emancipated some or all of their black population. The table below shows the percentage of free blacks as a percentage of the total black population in various U.S. regions and U.S. states between 1790 and 1860 (the blank areas on the chart below mean that there is no data for those specific regions or states in those specific years).

a There were no blacks at all—either free or enslaved—in South Dakota in 1860.

See also

 African American neighborhoods
 List of African American neighborhoods
 List of U.S. cities with large African-American populations
 List of U.S. counties with African-American majority populations
 List of U.S. metropolitan areas with large African-American populations
 Black Southerners

References

African American
African-American demographics
African American
African American-related lists